Street Acquaintances of St. Pauli (German: Straßenbekanntschaften auf St. Pauli) is a 1968 West German crime drama film directed by Werner Klingler and starring Günther Stoll, Rainer Brandt and Dagmar Lassander.

It was shot at the Wandsbek Studios in Hamburg and on location around St. Pauli.

Synopsis
A nightclub owner who runs a major prostitution ring in the red light district of Hamburg kidnaps the daughter of an official in order to get him to stop investigating his business.

Cast
 Günther Stoll as Inspector Torber 
 Rainer Brandt as Ingo Werner 
 Suse Wohl as Susanne Petersen 
 Sibille Gilles as Renate Petersen 
 Dagmar Lassander as Gerti Weber 
 Reinhard Kolldehoff as Radebach 
 Jürgen Feindt as Jensen 
 Gabriele Gutkind as Viola 
 Manuela Bock as Ilona 
 Mathias Grimm as Manfred 
 Richard Haller as Oehrchen 
 Charles Huttin as Hinkefuss
 Ingrid Bethke as Petra

References

Bibliography
 Bock, Hans-Michael & Bergfelder, Tim. The Concise CineGraph. Encyclopedia of German Cinema. Berghahn Books, 2009.

External links

1968 films
1968 crime drama films
1960s exploitation films
German crime drama films
West German films
1960s German-language films
Films directed by Werner Klingler
Films shot at Wandsbek Studios
Films shot in Hamburg
Films set in Hamburg
Films about prostitution in Germany
1960s German films